Hellinsia zetes is a moth of the family Pterophoridae that is found in Brazil and Costa Rica.

The forewings are pale brown to creamy‑white and the markings are dark brown. The hindwings and fringes are brown‑grey. Adults are on wing in May and July.

References

zetes
Moths described in 1930
Moths of Central America
Moths of South America